The 1970 Northern Iowa Panthers football team represented the University of Northern Iowa as a member of the North Central Conference (NCC) during the 1970 NCAA College Division football season. Led by 11th-year head coach, the Panthers compiled an overall record of 2–8 with a mark of 1–5 in conference play, tying for sixth place in the NCC.

The team's statistical leaders included Gary Weber with 578 passing yards, Larry Skartvedt with 488 receiving yards, and Roger Jones with 404 rushing yards.

Schedule

References

Further reading

Northern Iowa
Northern Iowa Panthers football seasons
Northern Iowa football